Kormoran II (Cormorant Class) - officially project 258, mine hunting type of vessels in building for the Polish Navy. The 2011 Defense Budget included a single vessel of this class. It was launched on 4 September 2015 and was predicted to enter service late 2016. Two more ships have been planned. Ships are built by Remontowa Shipbuilding Gdańsk and Naval Shipyard Gdynia consortium. It will be armed with 35 mm KDA anti-aircraft cannon.

Construction 
Project 258 vessels are 58.5 m long and 10.3 m wide. The draft is 2.7 meters and the displacement is 830 tons. Contrary to previous construction concepts of this type, the hull was made of non-magnetic steel instead of plastic. The advantage of the steel hull was, among other things, lower operating costs and higher fire resistance. The hull itself is divided into 33 sections. The ship's superstructure has two floors in the fore section and one floor in the stern. The main deck has full bulwark. When constructing the ship, efforts were made to limit the unit's detectability by radars. It is powered by two combustion engines with a capacity of 1,360 hp each, which allows a maximum speed of 15 knots. Additionally, the minesweeper has a bow thruster. The main armament of the ship is a 35 mm KDA type cannon that works with the ZGS-158 optoelectronic head. The ship is equipped with the Integrated Combat System manufactured and supplied by CTM, including: SCOT combat management system, passive defense system, underwater observation system, including SHL-101 / TM and SHL-300  sonar stations and a system of remotely and wirelessly fired charges explosives for destroying sea mines "Toczek". On the other hand, Xblue Inertial Navigation Systems (INS) have been selected to provide critical navigation capabilities to the Polish Navy’s new-build Kormoran II class mine countermeasure vessels.

Description 
The main tasks of the Kormoran II type units include searching, classification, identification and fighting sea mines, identification of fairways, guiding units through mine hazard waters, putting mines and remote control of self-propelled anti-mine platforms.

Vessels 
A lead ship ORP Kormoran (601) was commissioned on 28 November 2017. In summer 2018 building of a second ship of this project - named ORP Albatros (602) - was initiated. Albatros was launched on 10 October 2019 and construction of third ship, ORP Mewa (603), also started on that day. Mewa was launched on 17 December 2020. It's planned to build another 3 ships in 2029-2031.

References

Mine warfare vessels of Poland
Science and technology in Poland